The 2017 LBA Finals was the championship series of the 2016–17 regular season, of the Lega Basket Serie A, known for sponsorship reasons as the Serie A PosteMobile, the highest professional basketball league in Italy, and the conclusion of the season's playoffs. The second placed Umana Reyer Venezia possessing home advantage (with the first two, the fifth and the seventh games at the Palasport Giuseppe Taliercio) and the 4th placed Dolomiti Energia Trento contested for the title in a best-of-7 showdown, from June 10 to 20, 2017.
These were the first Finals for Trento and the 3rd for Venezia.

Umana Reyer Venezia won their 3rd title by beating Dolomiti Energia Trento in game 6 of the finals.

Melvin Ejim of the Umana Reyer Venezia was named MVP in the league's Finals series of the playoffs.

Road to the finals

Regular season series

Series

Game 1

Game 2

Game 3

Game 4

Game 5

Game 6

Rosters

Umana Reyer Venezia

Dolomiti Energia Trento

References

External links
Official website

Finals
Lega Basket Serie A Finals